OH 8 may refer to:

Ohio State Route 8
Ohio's 8th congressional district
Olduvai Hominid 8